Dan Kennedy is an American writer, and an original developer of The Moth storytelling podcast in New York.

Biography 
Kennedy's writing first gained attention at the McSweeney's literary website and quarterly journal. He started performing on stage with New York-based storytelling collective The Moth in 2000, going on to become a regular host of the popular live events and instrumental in developing and releasing The Moth podcast. In 2018, Wired Magazine celebrated the 10th anniversary of the podcast in a profile outlining its rise from two thousand subscribers to forty-six million downloads per year. In 2019, the podcast was downloaded 71 million times. In 2022, Kennedy discussed the creation of The Moth Podcast in Episode #773. 

With a background in New York advertising and the music industry, Kennedy moved into writing for film and television, selling series pilots to HBO and F/X and working on feature film screenwriting assignments at Amblin, Paramount, and Amazon Studios. In 2021, he served as Consultant on the NBC Peacock Original Series "True Story with Ed and Randall" and previously sat on the judging committees of the PEN America Jean Stein Grant for Literary Oral History, and the Writers Guild of America East "Made in New York" Television Fellowship Program.

In 2003 Kennedy published his first *book, Loser Goes First: My Thirty-Something Years of Dumb Luck and Minor Humiliation, with Random House. A memoir followed in 2008 entitled Rock On: An Office Power Ballad, which the New York Times described as "...a succession of gently mordant vignettes, with hilariously spot-on asides about media image-making". He discussed the book, and his time working for Atlantic Records in New York, with Terry Gross on NPR's "Fresh Air". Kennedy's debut novel American Spirit was released in 2013, receiving the coveted starred review from Publishers Weekly, which heralded the book as having, "...far surpassed the creation of character and conjured an entity so alive in its knowledge of impending death that we're captured in a new idea of what it's like to live." Kennedy's work has appeared in GQ Magazine and on the Peabody Award winning Moth Radio Hour, and has been published in multiple literary anthologies in Europe and the United States.

*There should be no confusion between his published works and certain/any non-fiction Sales and Marketing, Advertising, or financial advice books or articles, as he has authored none, is not referenced in any such works, does not in any way endorse said works, and claims no legal responsibility for the advice given therein.

Bibliography

Books 
 Loser Goes First: My Thirty-Something Years of Dumb Luck and Minor Humiliation (Random House/Crown, 2003)
 Rock On: An Office Power Balled (Algonquin, 2008)
 American Spirit: A Novel (Houghton Mifflin Harcourt/Littla a, 2013)

Selected anthologies 
Embrace the Merciless Joy: The McSweeney's Guide to Rearing Small, Medium, and Large Children (2023) Edited by Chris Monks, Jennifer Traig
How to Tell a Story: The Essential Guide to Memorable Storytelling from The Moth, by The Moth (2022) 
 The Moth Presents: Occasional Magic. True Stories About Defying the Impossible, edited by Catherine Burns (2019)
 Keep Scrolling Till You Feel Something: 21 Years of Humor from McSweeney's Internet Tendency (2019) edited by Chris Monks, Sam Riley
 McSweeney's Issue 50 (McSweeney's Quarterly Concern) (2017), edited by Dave Eggers
 Created in Darkness by Troubled Americans: The Best of McSweeney's Humor, Editors Dave Eggers, Kevin Shay, Lee Epstein, John Warner, Suzanne Kleid
 Our Noise: The Story of Merge Records, by John Cook, Mac McCaughan, Laura Ballance, Ray Porter
 Humor Me: An Anthology of Funny Contemporary Writing (Plus Some Great Old Stuff Too), edited by Ian Frazier
 Bookmark Now: Writing in Unreaderly Times, Edited by Kevin Sampsell
 The Encyclopedia of Exes, Edited by Meredith Broussard
 The Autobiographer's Handbook: The 826 National Guide to Writing Your Memoir, edited by Jennifer Traig
 McSweeney's Issue 35 (McSweeney's Quarterly Concern), edited by Dave Eggers
 The McSweeney's Book of Politics and Musicals, by the Editors of McSweeney's
 The Insomniac Reader: Stories of the Night, Edited by Kevin Sampsell
 The Best of McSweeney's Internet Tendency, Edited by Chris Monks, John Warner
 Love Is a Four-Letter Word: True Stories of Breakups, Bad Relationships, and Broken Hearts, Edited by Michael Taeckens
 Mountain Man Dance Moves: The McSweeney's Book of Lists, by the Editors of McSweeney's

References

External links 
 Dan Kennedy interview on NPR's Fresh Air
  Dan Kennedy interview on NPR's Weekend Edition
  Dan Kennedy on NPR's Ask Me Another
 Bullseye with Jesse Thorn: Christopher Guest, Vampire Weekend, Dan Kennedy.
 Archived work with The Moth
 Archived work with McSweeney's

American male writers
American podcasters
American humorists
American screenwriters
Living people
Year of birth missing (living people)